R.K. Anand (born 1 February 1961) is a politician from the Indian state of Manipur. He represented the Naoriya assembly constituency for two terms from 2007–2012 and from 2012–2017.

References

Indian National Congress politicians
Manipur Peoples Party politicians
Manipur politicians
Living people
1961 births
People from Imphal